Dichomeris mitteri is a moth in the family Gelechiidae. It was described by Kyu-Tek Park in 1994. It is found in China (Shaanxi), Korea and Japan (Honshu, Kyushu).

The length of the forewings is 6.5-6.7 mm. The forewings are yellowish ochreous, with a dark brown fascia along the anterior margin and a dark brown fascia along the termen. The hindwings are grey, but darker towards the termen.

References

Moths described in 1994
mitteri